Live from Long Beach is a live album by the American hardcore punk band T.S.O.L., released in 2008 through Cider City Records.

Track listing

Personnel
Band
Jack Grisham – vocals
Ron Emory – guitar; backing vocals; lead vocals on "Die for Me" and "In My Head"; co-lead vocals on "I'm Tired of Life"
Mike Roche – bass guitar
Anthony Biuso – drums
Greg Kuehn – keyboards

Production
Bob Emory – recording engineer, mix engineer

References

T.S.O.L. albums
2008 live albums